Kepler-1625b I, a possible moon of exoplanet Kepler-1625b, may be the first exomoon ever discovered (pending confirmation), and was first indicated after preliminary observations by the Kepler Space Telescope. A more thorough observing campaign by the Hubble Space Telescope took place in October 2017, ultimately leading to a discovery paper published in Science Advances in early October 2018. Studies related to the discovery of this moon suggest that the host exoplanet is up to several Jupiter masses in size, and the moon is thought to be approximately the mass of Neptune. Like several moons in the Solar System, the large exomoon would theoretically be able to host its own moon, called a subsatellite, in a stable orbit, although no evidence for such a subsatellite has been found.

Studies and observations 
The original paper presented two independent lines of evidence for the exomoon, a transit timing variation indicating a Neptune-mass moon, and a photometric dip indicating a Neptune-radius moon. An independent re-analysis of the observations published in February 2019 recovered both but suggested that an inclined and hidden hot-Jupiter could also be responsible, which could be tested with future Doppler spectroscopy radial velocity observations. A third study analyzing this data set recovered the transit timing variation signature but not the photometric dip, and thus questioned the exomoon hypothesis. The original discovery team later addressed this paper, finding that their re-reduction exhibits higher systematics that may explain their differing conclusions.

See also 
 Kepler-1708b
 2MASS J11193254–1137466 AB
 PDS 70
 V1400 Centauri
 Subsatellite

References 

Exomoons